Abdul Rashid Godil (born 7 September 1960) is a Pakistani politician who had been a member of National Assembly of Pakistan, from 2008 to May 2018.

Early life

Political career
In 1991, he was elected as a member of the All Pakistan Memon Federation and later, was elected as its president.

He began his political career in 2005 and became a union council Nazim the same year.

He was elected to the National Assembly of Pakistan from NA-252 (Karachi) on ticket of Muttahida Qaumi Movement in 2008 Pakistani general election.

He was re-elected to the National Assembly of Pakistan from NA-252 (Karachi) on ticket of Muttahida Qaumi Movement in 2013 Pakistani general election.

In June 2018, he quit MQM and joined PTI.

References

Living people
Muttahida Qaumi Movement MNAs
Pakistani MNAs 2013–2018
Politicians from Karachi
1960 births
Pakistani MNAs 2008–2013
Memon people
Pakistan Tehreek-e-Insaf politicians